Operation Able Rising Force was a military operation in December 2006 in Iraq by US troops and Iraqi police and troops for purposes of counterinsurgency to locate and detain suspected terrorists.

Operation Details
The operation was a combined effort between Soldiers from 1st Battalion, 1st Brigade, 4th Iraqi Army Division, local police and troops from 1st Brigade Combat Team, 3rd Infantry Division.

Occurring in Khadisia, about eight kilometers north of Tikrit, Operation Able Rising Force was set up to locate and detain suspected terrorists. Among the 52 detainees were three terrorists wanted for improvised explosive device (IED) attacks against civilians and the military.

Units
 United States Units
1st Brigade Combat Team, 3rd Infantry Division
 Iraqi Units
1st Battalion, 1st Brigade, 4th Iraqi Army Division

See also

List of coalition military operations of the Iraq War

References

 Press Release A051210c
 www.globalsecurity.org

Military operations of the Iraq War in 2006
Military operations of the Iraq War involving the United States
Military operations of the Iraq War involving Iraq
Iraqi insurgency (2003–2011)